Undefeated is a 2011 documentary film directed by Daniel Lindsay and T. J. Martin. The film documents the struggles of a high school football team, the Manassas Tigers of Memphis, as they attempt a winning season after years of losses. The team is turned around by coach Bill Courtney, who helps form a group of young men into an academic and athletic team.

Production
Lindsay and Martin served as co-directors, cinematographers, sound recorders and editors, recording more than 500 hours of footage.

Sean "Diddy" Combs joined the film as an executive producer in early February, 2012, with plans to work with the Weinstein Co. on the remake.

Reception
The film received critical acclaim at the South by Southwest conference in March 2011. The Weinstein Company was reported to have closed a seven-figure deal for distribution and remake rights to Undefeated.

The film holds a 96% approval rating on review aggregation website Rotten Tomatoes, based on 102 reviews with an average rating of 7.91/10. The website's critical consensus reads, "It covers familiar sports documentary territory, but Undefeated proves there are still powerful stories to be told on the high school gridiron." On Metacritic, the film has a weighted average score of 71 out of 100, based on 29 critics, indicating "generally favorable reviews".

Accolades
On February 26, 2012, the movie won an Oscar for Best Documentary Feature.

References

External links
 
 
 
 

2011 films
2011 documentary films
2010s sports films
American sports documentary films
Best Documentary Feature Academy Award winners
Documentary films about American football
Documentary films about Tennessee
2010s English-language films
Films scored by Michael Brook
Films set in Memphis, Tennessee
Films shot in Tennessee
High school football films
Sports in Memphis, Tennessee
2010s high school films
2010s American films